The 7th New Zealand Parliament was a term of the Parliament of New Zealand.

Elections for this term were held in 69 European electorates between 28 August and 15 September 1879. Elections in the four Māori electorates were held on 1 and 8 September of that year. A total of 88 MPs were elected. Parliament was prorogued in November 1881. During the term of this Parliament, two Ministries were in power.

Sessions

The 7th Parliament opened on 24 September 1879, following the 1879 general election. It sat for three sessions, and was prorogued on 8 November 1881.

Historical context

Political parties had not been established yet; this only happened after the 1890 election. Anyone attempting to form an administration thus had to win support directly from individual MPs. This made first forming, and then retaining a government difficult and challenging.

Ministries
The Grey Ministry had been in power since 13 October 1877 during the term of the 6th Parliament. It lasted until 8 October 1879, when the Hall Ministry under Premier John Hall formed a new caucus. This ministry lasted until 21 April 1882, well into the term of the 8th Parliament.

Initial composition of the 7th Parliament
88 seats were created across the electorates.

Changes during term
There were a number of changes during the term of the 7th Parliament.

Notes

References

07